Brush Creek Township may refer to the following townships in the United States:

 Brush Creek Township, Washington County, Arkansas
 Brush Creek Township, Faribault County, Minnesota
 Brush Creek Township, Gasconade County, Missouri
 Brush Creek Township, Wright County, Missouri
 Brush Creek Township, Adams County, Ohio
 Brush Creek Township, Muskingum County, Ohio
 Brush Creek Township, Scioto County, Ohio
 Brush Creek Township, Jefferson County, Ohio
 Brush Creek Township, Fulton County, Pennsylvania

See also 
 Brushcreek Township, Highland County, Ohio